Annie Chandler Grevers (born August 21, 1987) is an American former competitive swimmer who specialized in breaststroke events and was a two-time Pan American Games gold medalist as well as a World University Games gold medalist. Chandler is a former member of the United States National Team. She is currently married to Olympic gold medalist Matt Grevers.

Personal life
Annie's parents are Barbara and Thomas Chandler. Her father Tom played football in the NFL, Canadian Football League, and the World Football League. Her cousin, Scott Chandler, is a former NFL tight end for the New England Patriots. She has three brothers named Corey, Ben, and Luke. She is married to Matt Grevers, an Olympic Swimmer. He proposed to her on the podium at the Missouri Grand Prix on February 11, 2012, and they married on April 6, 2013, in San Antonio, Texas.

Swimming career
As a freshman at the 2007 NCAA Swimming and Diving Championships, she placed 2nd in the 100 y breast and 14th in the 200 y breast. Both her 200 y and 400 y medley relays came in 1st place. In her sophomore year, her 200 y medley relay placed 1st and so did her 400 y medley relay. Individually, she came in 3rd in the 100 breast and 8th in the 200 breast. Junior year, she placed 4th in the 100 breast, 7th in the 200 breast, and her 400 medley relay placed 1st again. In her senior year in 2010, Chandler placed 1st in the 100 breast and 3rd in the 200 breast.

In Chandler's first Olympic Trials in 2008, she placed 5th in the 100 breast and 17th in the 200 breast. In 2010, Chandler placed second in the 100m breaststroke at the 2010 U.S. Summer Nationals, which qualified her for the 2010 Pan Pacific Championships and for the 2011 World University Games. At the 2010 Pan Pacific Championships, Chandler placed fourth in the 50m breast. At the World University Games in 2011, she won a gold medal in the 50m breast and silver in the 4 × 100 m medley relay. Swimming in the 2011 Pan American Games, Chandler won the 100 m breaststroke with a time of 1:07.90 and the  medley relay with a time of 4:01.00, which was a new Pan American Games record. At her second Olympic Trials in 2012, she placed 5th again in the 100 breast and 19th in the 50 free.

Accolades
In 2020, she was inducted into the University of Arizona Sports Hall of Fame.

Notes

 

1987 births
Living people
Sportspeople from San Antonio
American female swimmers
Swimmers at the 2011 Pan American Games
Arizona Wildcats women's swimmers
Pan American Games gold medalists for the United States
Pan American Games medalists in swimming
Universiade medalists in swimming
Universiade gold medalists for the United States
Universiade silver medalists for the United States
Medalists at the 2011 Summer Universiade
Medalists at the 2011 Pan American Games